Indian Creek Township is a township in Story County, Iowa, USA.  As of the 2000 census, its population was 1496.

Geography
According to the USGS, it contains three cemeteries: Woodland Cemetery, Brubaker Cemetery and Peoria Cemetery.

County Road S27 runs north and south through the township and Iowa Hwy 210 runs east–west.

References
 USGS Geographic Names Information System (GNIS)

External links
 US-Counties.com
 City-Data.com

Townships in Story County, Iowa
Townships in Iowa